IMW may refer to:

Illuminati Motor Works Seven
Imperial Wharf railway station, London (National Rail station code)
Irvine Meadows West formerly part of the University of California, Irvine student housing
 The International Map of the World